The 2020 Dr McKenna Cup, known for sponsorship reasons as the Bank of Ireland Dr McKenna Cup, is a Gaelic football competition in the province of Ulster for county teams. It is held at the beginning of the GAA season.

The draw was made on 4 December 2019 with the fixtures confirmed following a meeting of Comhairle Uladh CCC later in the month. For the first time in many years, no university teams will take part, due to the changed schedule for the Sigerson Cup.

Tyrone were the winners for the eighth time in nine years.

Competition format
Group Stage

The nine teams were drawn into three sections of three teams. Each team plays the other teams in their section once, either home or away. Two points are awarded for a win and one for a draw. The points-ratio method (points for divided by points against) is used to determine the ranking of teams who are level on section points (as opposed to the more typical scoring differential).
The competition will begin on Sunday 29 December 2019.

Knock-out Stage

The winners of the three sections and the best of the runners-up in the three sections compete in the semi-finals with the two winners meeting in the final.

Group stage

Section A

Section B

Section C

Ranking of section runners-up

Knock-out stage

Semi-finals

Final

References

 
Dr McKenna Cup seasons